General Güemes, sometimes shortened in Güemes, is a town in the center of the province of Salta, Argentina.

Overview
It lies about 45 km east-northeast from the provincial capital Salta, on National Route 9. Its name is an homage to caudillo Martín Miguel de Güemes (1785–1821), hero of the Argentine War of Independence.

In 2008, the city gained media attention after sightings of a "mysterious gnome" were reported.

Transport
General Güemes is the terminus station of narrow gauge train that connects it to Salta.

References

External links
 
 General Güemes at the Chamber of Deputies of Salta.

Populated places in Salta Province
Cities in Argentina
Argentina
Salta Province